Coalville is a city in and the county seat of Summit County, Utah, United States. It is part of the Salt Lake City, Utah Metropolitan Statistical Area. The population was 1,363 as of the 2010 census. Interstate 80 passes through the town, as well as the Weber River, which flows into Echo Reservoir, just north of Coalville.

History

Coalville originally began as a settlement known as Chalk Creek. In 1854, the territorial government in Utah offered a $1000 reward to anyone who could find coal within 40 miles of Salt Lake City. Four years later, Thomas Rhodes found a coal vein in the Chalk Creek area, and coal mining began in earnest. Hundreds of tons of coal were shipped to Salt Lake City, and soon a narrow gauge railroad was built. The settlement was then renamed Coalville, as a result of this early success. 

Coalville was officially founded in 1859 by William Henderson Smith, an early Mormon freighter. He noticed that wheat, spilled by other wagons moving through the area, would grow to maturity without being tended. He subsequently convinced four families to settle in the area with him.

Early life in Coalville was difficult, and during winters, the settlers dealt with a constant scarcity of food. When food ran out, they would travel to Salt Lake City for supplies. The local Indian tribes were also hostile for a time, and the settlers built a fort on the advice of Brigham Young. In 1867, Coalville was incorporated.

By 1880, success in the coal industry led to the extension of the railroad into Park City. Then known as the Summit County Railway, the railroad continued to transport coal and was also used for Park City's silver mines.

Unlike most Mormon settlements in Utah and the intermountain west, Coalville city streets are not aligned to the true north. Main Street in Coalville is offset such that it runs slightly north-northwest, and Center street runs slightly east-northeast. 

Both the Thomas L. Allen House and the Summit Stake Tabernacle in Coalville are listed on the National Register of Historic Places.

Geography and climate

Coalville has a high-altitude, warm-summer humid continental climate (Köppen Dfb), characterized by extreme diurnal temperature ranges that range from extremely cold winter nights to hot afternoons in the summer. However, the high altitude and low humidity mean that mornings in the summer remain very cool, and frosts have occasionally occurred—even in July.

Coalville is located at the intersection of two narrow valleys—formed by Chalk Creek and the Weber River. Like other valley locations in northern Utah, Coalville experiences pronounced temperature inversions associated with high-pressure systems during winter months, with low temperatures below 0 °F relatively common. Owing to this localized phenomenon, observed low temperatures are often significantly lower than those forecasted by national agencies.

Demographics

As of the census of 2000, there were 1,382 people, 465 households, and 371 families residing in the city. The population density was 483.9 people per square mile (/km2). There were 495 housing units at an average density of 173.3 per square mile (/km2). The racial makeup of the city was 93.13% White, 0.07% African American, 0.80% Native American, 0.29% Asian, 0.07% Pacific Islander, 4.92% from other races, and 0.72% from two or more races. Hispanic or Latino of any race were 6.87% of the population.

There were 465 households, out of which 47.3% had children under the age of 18 living with them, 68.6% were married couples living together, 8.0% had a female householder with no husband present, and 20.2% were non-families. 18.3% of all households were made up of individuals, and 10.3% had someone living alone who was 65 years of age or older. The average household size was 2.97, and the average family size was 3.41.

In the city, the population was spread out, with 33.8% under 18, 10.7% from 18 to 24, 28.9% from 25 to 44, 15.7% from 45 to 64, and 10.9% who were 65 years of age or older. The median age was 28 years. For every 100 females, there were 104.7 males. For every 100 females aged 18 and over, there were 103.3 males.

The median income for a household in the city was $39,342, and the median income for a family was $43,929. Males had a median income of $32,727 versus $20,833 for females. The per capita income for the city was $17,830. About 5.9% of families and 8.0% of the population were below the poverty line, including 11.9% of those under age 18 and 6.2% of those aged 65 or over.

Education
It is in the North Summit School District. The district consists of North Summit High School, Middle School, and Elementary School. North Summit High School's mascot is the Brave, and the school colors are purple and gold. The school mascot was chosen because of the Western Shoshone tribes that once lived in the area. Members of the North Summit High School drill team are known as "Esona," purportedly from the Shoshone word for "woman." In 1964-65 the Braves won the Class B football state championship. In 2004 when North Summit Middle School was built, a burial plot with five graves was discovered on its construction site. Because of local legend, many thought the graves to contain the remains of Native Americans, however, officials reported the individuals were likely early settlers of Norwegian descent.

Economy
Some residents of the Coalville area pursue careers in farming, ranching, construction, public education, and county government—though many commutes to the Wasatch Front. Ranchers in the area primarily raise beef and dairy cows, sheep, and mink. Crops such as alfalfa and wheat are also cultivated.

There are two grocery stores, five restaurants, two motels, and several small gas/convenience stores. A health clinic serves residents of Coalville and other settlements in northern Summit County, as well as a dental office. Vacant commercial real estate continues to be a problem, especially along the main street, as is the case in many small towns in rural America—an effect of urbanization.

See also

 List of cities and towns in Utah
 Anthony Geary
 Brant Boyer
 Interstate 80
 List of Registered Historic Places in Utah: Summit County
 U.S. Route 530

References

External links

 

Cities in Utah
Cities in Summit County, Utah
County seats in Utah
Salt Lake City metropolitan area
Populated places established in 1859
1859 establishments in Utah Territory